Íñigo Melchor Fernández de Velasco, 7th Duke of Frías, GE, KOS (16 April 1629 – 27 September 1696), was a Spanish nobleman and Governor-General of the Spanish Netherlands.

Biography
His father was Bernardino Fernández de Velasco, 6th Duke of Frías and his mother was Isabel Maria de Guzmán. King John IV of Portugal was his cousin. He married Maria Teresa de Benavídes Dávila y Corella and had one daughter, María Remigia, VII Marquesa de Berlanga (c. 1678 to 1734).

He was a very influential political figure during the reign of Carlos II of Spain. He inherited the title of Constable of Castile from his father, was a member of both the State council and the War Council, Governor of Galicia, and became Governor of the Spanish Netherlands between 1668 and 1670. In 1676 he was appointed as Mayordomo mayor to the King, chief of his Household.

His painting by Murillo from 1659 can be seen in the Louvre. After his death in 1696, the title of Duke of Frías went to his nephew José Fernández de Velasco, 8th Duke of Frías (circa 1665 – 1704).

Additional information

Notes

Sources

 
His portrait by Murillo

External links 

1629 births
1696 deaths
109
107
Governors of the Habsburg Netherlands
Inigo
Spanish diplomats
Grandees of Spain